Gulf Coast Blues and Impressions 2: A Louisiana Wetlands Benefit is the thirteenth album of pianist George Winston, also his thirteenth solo piano album, released in 2012. It is his third benefit release, made as a fundraiser for the Louisiana Wetlands. The album furthers the benefit work to help victims of the 2005 Hurricane Katrina disaster that began with fundraising efforts from his Gulf Coast Blues and Impressions: A Hurricane Relief Benefit CD released in 2006.

Track listing

References

External links
Liner Notes (PDF)

2012 albums
George Winston albums
RCA Records albums
Dancing Cat Records albums
Charity albums